Charles Macintosh FRS (29 December 1766 – 25 July 1843) was a Scottish chemist and the inventor of the modern waterproof raincoat. The Mackintosh raincoat (the variant spelling is now standard) is named after him.

Biography
Macintosh was born in Glasgow, Scotland, the son of George Macintosh and Mary Moore, and was first employed as a clerk. Charles devoted his spare time to science, particularly chemistry, and before he was 20 resigned his clerkship to study under Joseph Black at the University of Edinburgh, and to take up the manufacture of chemicals. In this he was highly successful and invented various new processes. His experiments with naphtha led to his invention of waterproof rubberized fabric; the essence of his patent was the cementing of two thicknesses of cloth together with natural rubber. The rubber is made soluble by the action of the naphtha. The naphtha was prepared by distillation of coal tar, with the Bonnington Chemical Works being a major supplier.

Macintosh married Mary Fisher in 1790, daughter of Alexander Fisher, a Glasgow merchant. They had one son, George Macintosh (1791–1848). In 1823, he was elected a fellow of the Royal Society for his chemical discoveries. In 1828, he became a partner with James Beaumont Neilson in a firm to exploit the latter's patent for the hot blast blowing of blast furnaces, which saved considerably on their fuel consumption.

Charles died in 1843 and was buried in the Glasgow Cathedral graveyard. He is buried with his parents in the ground of his great grandfather, John Anderson of Douhill, Lord Provost of Glasgow. His name is added to the 17th century monument which stands against the eastern boundary wall. A late 19th century secondary memorial also exists, in polished red granite, slightly to the north, where Charles is again mentioned on the grave of his son, George.

Legacy
On 29 December 2016, the search engine Google marked the 250th anniversary of the birth of the inventor of the waterproof raincoat with a Google doodle of Macintosh in the rain.

References

Further reading

External links

Charles Rennie Macintosh Society

1766 births
1843 deaths
Fellows of the Royal Society
Scientists from Glasgow
Alumni of the University of Edinburgh
Scottish chemists
Scottish inventors
Burials at Glasgow Cathedral